In property law, the term free and clear refers to ownership without legal encumbrances, such as a lien or mortgage.  So, for example: a person owns a house free and clear if he has paid off the mortgage and no creditor has filed a lien against it.

Lately there has been a resurgence in interest for free and clear properties despite being an investment form that has been prevalent from early on. Investing in free and clear properties removes the need for a bank loan entirely. 
Over 35% of all properties in the United States are owned free and clear with no outstanding mortgages or liens.

See also
Land title
Legal doublet

References

Property law